The 2008 New Jersey Democratic presidential primary took place February 5, 2008, also known as Super Tuesday.  Hillary Clinton won this primary.

Polls

Results

See also
 2008 Democratic Party presidential primaries
 2008 New Jersey Republican presidential primary

References

External links
Official state totals (not yet fully updated)

New Jersey
2008 New Jersey elections
2008
2008 Super Tuesday